Petra Jauch-Delhees (born 28 March 1959), born Petra Delhees, is a former professional tennis player from Switzerland.

Biography
Delhees, a left-hander, began playing Federation Cup tennis for Switzerland as a 17-year old in 1976. She was a member of the 1981 and 1983 Swiss semifinal teams, the latter her final season. She finished with a 33-15 overall record, at the time the Swiss record for the number of wins. Her doubles partnership with Christiane Jolissaint, which resulted in ten wins, is the most prolific in the Fed Cup for Switzerland.

From 1983 she was known as Petra Jauch-Delhees after marrying German Peter Jauch. She was a doubles finalist with Patricia Medrado at the 1983 Swiss Open.

She had her best performance at Grand Slam level when she upset sixth seed Manuela Maleeva in the first round of the 1984 US Open and made it to the round of 16 stage, despite entering the draw as a qualifier.

In 1985 was runner-up to Kathy Horvath at the Palm Beach Cup and won the Spanish Open doubles with Patricia Medrado. This was her last year of professional tennis and she retired after the 1985 French Open.

WTA career finals

Singles (0–1)

Doubles (1–1)

References

External links
 
 
 

1959 births
Living people
Swiss female tennis players
People from Aarau
Sportspeople from Aargau